Paulo Jorge Camões Martins (born 12 March 1983), known as Paulinho, is a Portuguese futsal player who plays for Portimonense and the Portugal national team.

References

External links
Sporting CP profile

1983 births
Living people
Sportspeople from Barreiro, Portugal
Portuguese men's futsal players
C.F. Os Belenenses futsal players
Sporting CP futsal players